Revolutionary Socialism is a Trotskyist political organisation in Portugal.  It was affiliated to the Committee for a Workers' International until 2019. Prior to 2008 it was named Socialist Alternative.

History 
With ongoing social unrest since the onset of the global recession in 2008, the organisation has been critical of the leadership of the CGTP and UGT union federations for their inaction and declining to take "the tremendous opportunity to call a general strike on the same day as the Spanish general strike". Revolutionary Socialism has also criticised the Portuguese Communist Party and Left Bloc for having "hardly used their influential position to mobilise people".

The organisation has been active in the campaign to stop evictions and the demolition of homes in the municipality of Amadora.

In 2019, the organisation left the CWI and joined International Revolutionary Left.

References

External links 
 Revolutionary Socialism
 Committee for a Workers' International

Communist parties in Portugal
Portugal
Political parties in Portugal
Political parties with year of establishment missing
Trotskyist organisations in Portugal